"Eat at Home" is a 1971 single by Paul and Linda McCartney that also appeared on their album Ram from the same year. The song, a standard rock number, features McCartney on lead vocals, electric guitar and bass, and Linda McCartney performing backing vocals.

Lyrics and music
Paul McCartney described the lyrics of "Eat at Home" as "a plea for home cooking – it's obscene." Beatle biographer John Blaney described it as fitting within the theme of many of McCartney's songs of the period, "extolling the virtues of domestic bliss and ... the love of a good woman." Music professor Vincent Benitez also considers the theme to be a celebration of Paul's domestic bliss with Linda in the wake of the Beatles' breakup.

"Eat at Home" is in the key of A major.  It is mostly a three-chord rock song, with predominant use of the tonic chord of A, the dominant chord of E and the subdominant chord of D. It also employs the leading-tone chord of G in turnaround sections between the verses and the bridge passages. Blaney described the music as being an "upbeat slice of retro-pop" that was influenced by McCartney's hero Buddy Holly.

Reception
Music critic Stewart Mason of AllMusic described it as McCartney's homage to Buddy Holly, and Stephen Thomas Erlewine, also of Allmusic, described it as "a rollicking, winking sex song." In a contemporary review for RAM, Jon Landau of Rolling Stone described "Eat at Home" as one of two only good songs he enjoyed on the album, also comparing it to Buddy Holly.  Goldmine contributor John Borack rated "Eat at Home" among his top 10 McCartney solo songs, praising its melody, its "slightly country-influence guitar pickin’" and Denny Seiwell's "pounding" drums.

Although John Lennon was highly critical of many of the songs on Ram, feeling they were veiled attacks on him, he publicly admitted that he enjoyed this particular song quite a bit.

Although not released as a single in the UK or the US, "Eat at Home" was released as a single in several European countries, South America, Japan, Australia and New Zealand, and reached #7 in the Netherlands and #6 in Norway.  Even in the US it received considerable radio airplay without having been released as a single.

Cover versions 
Little Joy often included a cover of the song in their setlist during the Little Joy tour.

Personnel
 Paul McCartney – lead vocals, bass guitar, electric guitar
 Linda McCartney – backing vocals
 David Spinozza – electric guitar
 Denny Seiwell – drums

Source: The Paul McCartney Project

Notes

References
 
 
 

Paul McCartney songs
Apple Records singles
1971 singles
Songs written by Paul McCartney
Songs written by Linda McCartney
Song recordings produced by Paul McCartney
Music published by MPL Music Publishing
1970 songs